The Duke is an American television miniseries that aired on ABC from April 5 to May 18, 1979.

Overview
The Duke follows an aging boxer who became a private investigator. This Chicago, Illinois-set series starred Robert Conrad as Oscar "Duke" Ramsey; Conrad was actually a professional fighter in his own early years.

The executive producer was Stephen J. Cannell, and the show was produced by Stephen J. Cannell Productions, in association with Universal TV.

Cast 
 Robert Conrad as Oscar "Duke" Ramsey
 Larry Manetti as Joe Cadillac
 Red West as Sergeant Mick O'Brien
 Patricia Conwell as Duke's friend, Dedra
 Ed O'Bradovich as Eddie, the bartender at Duke and Benny's Corner, the tavern Ramsey owns.

Episodes

External links 
 
 

1970s American television miniseries
1979 American television series debuts
1979 American television series endings
NBC original programming
Television series by Universal Television
Television series by Stephen J. Cannell Productions
English-language television shows
Television shows set in Chicago
American detective television series